Radhošť is a mountain in the Beskydy mountains of the Czech Republic.

Radhošť may also refer to:

 Radhošť (Ústí nad Orlicí District), a village in the Czech Republic
Radhost, volumes of Czech articles and essays by František Palacký published 1871–1873

See also
Rethra (also known as Radagoszcz, Radegost, Radigast, Redigast, Radgosc and other forms)
Radegast (disambiguation)